Eastern Michigan Eagles basketball may refer to either of the basketball teams that represent Eastern Michigan University:

Eastern Michigan Eagles men's basketball
Eastern Michigan Eagles women's basketball